Carex obispoensis, the San Luis Obispo sedge, is a species of flowering plant in the family Cyperaceae, native to San Luis Obispo County, California. It is a specialist on serpentine soil.

References

obispoensis
Endemic flora of California
Plants described in 1936